Iranikulam Sree Mahadeva Temple  is located at Iranikulam, Mala in Thrissur district. The temple has two main deities, Thekkadathappan and Vadakkedathappan. Both deities are Lord Shiva. In the rehabilitation of the temple, the new idol was replaced by a broken statue. The South shrine is generally considered to be the two-level Sanctum sanctorum shrine of Lord Shiva. The presiding deities of north shrine are Lord Shiva, Parvati and Subramanya dwell at the same altar in the sanctum sanctorum facing east. It is believed that this temple is one of the 108 Shiva temples of Kerala and is installed by sage Parasurama dedicated to Lord Shiva. The temple is located center of ancient Iranikulam grama (village). Maha Shivarathri festival of the temple celebrates in the Malayalam month of Kumbha (February - March).

Ancient Village
Iranikulam village is an ancient village and one of the 64 Brahmin villages in Kerala. Iranikulam is famous for its culture. When the governance of the Cheran administration was weakened, the temple administration was numbered. But when the internal squabbles broke out between them, the non-rulers were turned into two groups and made another deity of Lord Shiva in separate Sanctum sanctorum.

Recently discovered 500 years old art house collection from 'Chembari Madom', an old wooden box, known as 'North Pushpakam' is a residence of traditional Brahmin. They are considered to be devotees of Shri Lord Parvati's companionship. This manuscript was placed in Malayala era 639 month of Mithun (Ie, 1464 CE).

See also
 108 Shiva Temples
 Temples of Kerala
 Iranikulam Temple Website

Temple Photos

References

108 Shiva Temples
Shiva temples in Kerala
Hindu temples in Thrissur district